The Highways Act 1562 (5 Eliz. I c. 13), sometimes the Second Statute of Highways, was an Act of the Parliament of England, that was passed in 1563, which extended the provisions of the Highways Act 1555.

Background 
The Highways Act 1555 was an Act, passed in 1555 during the reign of Queen Mary I, which mandated that every householder of a parish had to provide four days labour in a year on the highways.

The Act 
The Act amended the original Act by extending the provisions for a further twenty years, and made the requirement six days labour rather than four. Supervisors of highway work were empowered to take debris from quarries and dig for gravel without permission of the landowners. The Act also empowered Justices of the Peace at Quarter Sessions to investigate and punish supervisors in cases where they were in dereliction of their duties, imposing fines as thought to be necessary.

Repeal 
It was repealed by section 57 of the Highways Act 1766 (7 Geo. III c. 42).

References

Bibliography 

1563 in law
1563 in England
Acts of the Parliament of England (1485–1603)
Roads in England
Transport policy in the United Kingdom
Transport legislation
History of transport in England